The Ministry of Parliamentary Affairs was a Sri Lankan government ministry responsible for providing support to Members of the Sri Lankan Parliament, through the provision of office space and equipment, personal staff, salary and insurance services and training to MPs. The duties of the ministry were merged with those of the Ministry of Lands and Parliamentary Reforms in May 2017, essentially resulting in the dissolution of the Ministry of Parliamentary Affairs.

List of ministers

The Minister of Parliamentary Affairs was an appointment in the Cabinet of Sri Lanka.

Parties

See also
 List of ministries of Sri Lanka
 Ministry of Lands and Parliamentary Reforms

References

External links
 Ministry of Parliamentary Affairs
 Government of Sri Lanka

Parliamentary Affairs
Parliamentary Affairs
Parliamentary affairs ministries